Nitratoauric acid, hydrogen tetranitratoaurate, or simply called gold(III) nitrate is a crystalline gold compound that forms the trihydrate,  or more correctly . This compound is an intermediate in the process of extracting gold. In older literature it is also known as aurinitric acid.

Preparation and reactions
Nitratoauric acid is prepared by the reaction of gold(III) hydroxide and concentrated nitric acid at 100 °C:

This compound reacts with potassium nitrate to form potassium tetranitratoaurate at 0 °C:

Properties
Nitratoauric acid trihydrate decomposes to the monohydrate at 72 °C. If continually heated to 203 °C, it decomposes to auric oxide.

Reference

Gold(III) compounds
Nitrates
Aurates